KCPL (90.5 FM) is a non-commercial educational radio station licensed to serve Astoria, Oregon, United States. The station is owned by Growing Christian Foundation.

History
This station received its original construction permit from the Federal Communications Commission on August 7, 2003. The new station was assigned the call letters KORM by the FCC on August 29, 2003. KORM received its license to cover from the FCC on November 2, 2006.

In December 2008, World Radio Network, Inc., agreed to sell KORM to Carlos Arana Ministries for a reported total sale price of $45,000. The deal was approved by the FCC on February 10, 2009, and consummated on April 9, 2009. The new owners had the call sign changed to KGIO on April 16, 2009.

On November 9, 2012, the sale of KGIO and translator K211ET to Centro Familiar Cristiano was consummated at a purchase price of $45,000.

Effective July 1, 2022, Centro Familiar Cristiano sold KGIO to Growing Christian Foundation for $80,000. The new owners changed the station's call sign to KCPL on July 12, 2022.

References

External links
 
 
 

CPL (FM)
CPL (FM)
Radio stations established in 2006
Clatsop County, Oregon
2006 establishments in Oregon